Caleta may refer to:

People
Duje Ćaleta-Car (born 1996), Croatian professional footballer

Places
 Caleta Chaihuín, a coastal hamlet in Corral, Chile
 Caleta Córdoba, a small village in Chubut, Argentina
 Caleta Olivia, a coastal city in Argentina 
 Caleta Tortel, a coastal village in Chile
 Caleta de Carquin District, in Huaura Province, Peru
 Caleta de Fuste, a community on the Canary Island of Fuerteventura; Antigua, Las Palmas, Spain 
 Caleta de Sebo, a settlement on the Canary Island of Graciosa; part of Teguise, Spain
 La Caleta, Spain, a beach in Cádiz, Spain
 La Caleta, Tenerife, a village in Adeje province, Tenerife, Spain
 Las Caletas, a beach near Puerto Vallarta, Jalisco, Mexico
 Catalan Bay, a bay and fishing village in Gibraltar, known colloquially as La Caleta
 La Caleta Airport, an airport in La Romana, Dominican Republic
 Punta Caleta, the easternmost point of Cuba

Nature
 Caleta (butterfly), a butterfly genus
 Caleta caleta, a blue butterfly species
 Caleta decidia, a blue butterfly species